Son of a Plumber is an album released by Swedish pop-rock singer and composer Per Gessle. It is the first album by Gessle to use a pseudonym artist name; Son of a Plumber. The album, which was officially released on 23 November 2005, is a double CD album packed with deeply personal and highly inventive music according to Gessle.

There were three singles released from the album. A double A-side, "C'mon"/"Jo-Anna Says" which was released on 7 November 2005, the second single "Hey Mr. DJ", on 1 February 2006 and the final release was "I Like It Like That" on 24 May to the Swedish radio stations.

The band
Son of a Plumber became a defined band, with Per Gessle, vocals and guitar, Clarence Öfwerman, keyboards, Christoffer Lundquist, guitar, Jens Jansson, drums, and Helena Josefsson, vocals.

They had all participated in Per's previous solo albums, The World According to Gessle (1997) & Mazarin (2003), except Helena Josefsson, who has been working with them since Mazarin. Together, they also went on to record Gessle's next solo albums, En händig man (2007) and Party Crasher (2008). They have been on the last Gessle tour too.

Musical Analysis

A lot of songs have typical Per characteristics (the lyrical romance and clever key changes); overall it is similar to the Beatles' White Album. Beatles' references can be heard in the music and they have their name in a title of a song.

The 'false' solo project become a duo with Helena Josefsson's leading vocals on "I Have a Party in My Head" and "Hey Mr DJ". "I Have a Party in My Head" demonstrates a typical Per trait by having rhyming verses. Another typical trait is some of the tracks include hooks, such as in "Jo-Anna Says" which has guitar riffs and lyrical repetition.

In between the main tracks there are some 1 minute long instrumentals that lead into the following song. "Kurt - the Fastest Plumber in the West" and "Ronnie Lane" are examples of this. The final track "Making Love or Expecting Rain" contained a few lines of French lyrics: "Je ne suis qu'un enfant. Je ne suis que ton enfant. J'ai confiance en toi, toujours en toi." which means "I'm just a child. I'm only your child. I trust you, always in you". Lasting five minutes, this is the longest song on the album. There is also a hidden track on the CD which is a reprise of "Jo-Anna Says", that comes after 10 minutes of silence at the end of the album.

Track listing

DISC 1
"Drowning in Wonderful Thoughts about Her"
"Jo-Anna Says"
"I Have a Party in My Head (I Hope it Never Ends)"
"C'mon"
"Week With Four Thursdays"
"Hey Mr DJ (Won't You Play Another Love Song)"
"Late, Later On"
"Ronnie Lane"
"Are You an Old Hippie, Sir?"
"Double-headed Elvis"
"Something in the System"
"Speed Boat to Cuba"
"Come Back Tomorrow (And We Do it Again)"

Tracks 9-13 are mixed together as a medley and named the Junior Suite.

DISC 2
"Kurt - The Fastest Plumber in the West"
"I Never Quite Got over the Fact that the Beatles Broke Up"
"Substitute (for the Real Deal)"
"Waltz for Woody"
"Carousel"
"I Like it Like That"
"Something Happened Today"
"Brilliant Career"
"Burned out Heart"
"Drowning in Wonderful Thoughts about Her (Reprise)"
"Making Love or Expecting Rain"
"Jo-Anna Says Farewell" (hidden track)

The digital release on iTunes came with the following bonus tracks:

1. "A Girl Like You" 
2. "Keep The Radio On (This is The Perfect Song)" (cover from The Lonely Boys – also included on the vinyl version)  
3. "Plonk"

Charts

References

External links
 Son Of a Plumber's official site
 PerGessle.net
 Gyllene Tider.com
 The Daily Roxette
 Roxette's official site

2005 albums
Per Gessle albums